Per Kjølberg (born 1941) is a Norwegian former competitive figure skater. He is a six-time Nordic champion and a seven-time Norwegian national champion. He placed ninth at the 1962 European Championships. 

In the 1970s he emigrated to North America to work as a figure skating coach in Canada.

Competitive highlights

References 

1941 births
Living people
Norwegian male single skaters
Norwegian emigrants to Canada